The list of ship launches in 2007 includes a chronological list of ships launched in 2007.


References

See also 

2007
Ship launches